Route 254 is a state highway in northwestern Connecticut running from Thomaston to Litchfield.

Route description
Route 254 begins as a continuation of State Road 848 (Waterbury Road) at a northbound exit from Route 8 (exit 38) in southeastern Thomaston. It heads north, crosses under the Route 8 expressway, and meets U.S. Route 6 at the point where eastbound US 6 joins northbound Route 8. Route 254 then continues north along South Main Street towards Thomaston center. In the town center, Route 254 then turns northwest along Northfield Road. Unsigned SR 807 continues north to connect to Route 222. Northfield Road follows the path of Northfield Brook into the town of Litchfield.

The section of Route 254 from Camp Hill Road in the village of Northfield to the northern terminus in Litchfield borough is designated as a state scenic road.

History
Prior to 1963, the Thomaston-Northfield-Litchfield road was an unsigned state highway designated as State Road 854. As part of the 1962 Route Reclassification Act, SR 854 was renumbered to Route 254 at the beginning of 1963. In 1967, Route 254 was extended southward along South Main Street (former US 6) to the north end of SR 848. A  section of the route (Litchfield Street) was relocated to a newly constructed two-lane road (southern end of modern Northfield Road) in 1970.

Junction list

References

External links

254
Transportation in Litchfield County, Connecticut